Mil Mi-17 is a Soviet-designed Russian military helicopter family.

MI-17 may also refer to:

M-17 (Michigan highway)

See also
MI17